Pingya is a township of Wudu District, Longnan, China. It has a population of 6350 as of 2020, divided over 9 villages and 18 residential communities. Between 2016 and 2018, 5,731 people of the township were resettled from a mountaintop to the Bailong River valley as part of poverty alleviation efforts, to improve transportation and available amenities.

References 

Township-level divisions of Gansu
Longnan